Monument to the March Dead is an expressionist monument in the Weimar Central Cemetery in Weimar, Germany that memorializes workers killed in the 1920 Kapp Putsch. A 1920 design produced by Walter Gropius, in collaboration with Fred Forbát, was selected from those submitted in a competition organized by the Gewerkschaftskartell (Union Cartel) and Städtisches Museum Weimar. 

Although Gropius had said that the Bauhaus should remain politically neutral, he agreed to participate in the competition of Weimar artists at the end of 1920.

The structure was built between 1920 and 1922. An unveiling ceremony for the memorial was held on May 1, 1922.

Objecting to it politically and as an example of what it characterized as degenerate art, the Nazis destroyed the monument in February 1936.

The structure was reconstructed in 1946.

Architecture
The form of the monument alludes to a thunderbolt. The structure is constructed of concrete.

The monument was arranged around an inner space, in which visitors could stand. The repeatedly fractured and highly angular memorial rose up on three sides, as if thrust up from or rammed into the earth.

Reception
Theo van Doesburg, leader of the De Stijl movement, criticized Gropius' expressionist design, decrying it as "the result of a cheap literary idea."

Gallery

References

External links
Interactive panorama of the monument

Walter Gropius buildings
Buildings and structures completed in 1927
Weimar